"Veni redemptor gentium" (Come, Redeemer of the nations) is a Latin Advent or Christmas hymn by Ambrose of Milan in iambic tetrameter. The hymn is assigned to the Office of Readings for Advent, from December 17 through December 24, in the Liturgy of the Hours. John Mason Neale and Thomas Helmore saw it as an Evening hymn for the period from Christmas to the eve of Epiphany.

History
The later hymn "Veni Creator Spiritus" borrows two lines from the hymn (Infirma nostri corporis — Virtute firmans perpeti). "Veni redemptor gentium" was particularly popular in Germany where Martin Luther translated it into German as "Nun komm, der Heiden Heiland," which then he, or possibly Johann Walter, set as a chorale, based on the original plainchant. Luther adapted the original chant tune separately for each of three other hymns: "Verleih uns Frieden gnädiglich", "" and "".

In the mid-nineteenth century, John Mason Neale translated "Veni redemptor gentium" into English as "Come, thou Redeemer of the earth". It is often sung to the tune "Puer nobis nascitur" by Michael Praetorius.

In 1959, Dom Paul Benoit, OSB adapted the chant melody as the hymn tune "Christian Love", for use with the text "Where Charity and Love Prevail," Omer Westendorf's  common metre translation of the Holy Thursday hymn "Ubi caritas."

Lyrics 

The metrical English translation was made by J. M. Neale.

References 

4th century in music
Latin-language Christian hymns
Advent songs